Pathrose is a surname. Notable people with the surname include:

A.T. Pathrose (1932–2020), Indian politician 
Manju Pathrose, Indian actress